Aygül-Tash is a botanical reserve in Batken District of Batken Region of Kyrgyzstan.  It was established in 2009 with a purpose of conservation of unique nature complexes and biodiversity of Kyrgyzstan.

Kyrgyzstan's State Commission for Environmental Protection and Forestry plans to give the area a special level of protection, with the aim of preserving the endemic Aigul flower.

References

Botanical reserves in Kyrgyzstan
Protected areas established in 1975